Boița is a commune in Sibiu County, Transylvania, Romania, at the foothills of the Cindrel Mountains,  south of the county capital Sibiu, in the Mărginimea Sibiului ethnographic area, on the main road between Sibiu and the southern part of Romania, the National road 7/European route 81, at the entrance of the Olt River defile. The commune is composed of four villages: Boița, Lazaret, Lotrioara (Latorvár) and Paltin. These were part of Tălmaciu town until 2004, when they were split off.

In 1910 the village had 1,657 inhabitants.

See also
 Caput Stenarum (castra)

References

Communes in Sibiu County
Localities in Transylvania